Marnay may refer to:


Places

France
 Canton of Marnay, administrative division of the Haute-Saône department
 Marnay, Haute-Saône, in the Haute-Saône department
 Marnay, Saône-et-Loire, in the Saône-et-Loire department
 Marnay, Vienne, in the Vienne department
 Marnay-sur-Marne, in the Haute-Marne department
 Marnay-sur-Seine, in the Aube department

Philippines
 Marnay, a barangay in Sinait, Ilocos Sur

People
 Audrey Marnay (born 1980), French actress and model
 Eddy Marnay (1920–2003), French songwriter

See also
 Marney, a surname